The Huggins Equation is an empirical equation used to relate the reduced viscosity of a dilute polymer solution to the concentration of the polymer in solution. It is named after Maurice L. Huggins. The Huggins equation states:

In isolation,  is the specific viscosity of a solution at a given concentration.

The Huggins equation is valid when  is much smaller than 1, indicating that it is a dilute solution. The Huggins coefficient used in this equation is an indicator of the strength of a solvent.

The Huggins equation is a useful tool because it can be used to determine the intrinsic viscosity, from experimental data by plotting versus the concentration of the solution, .

See also
 Viscosity
 Rheology

References 

Polymers
Viscosity